Smother is a 2008 comedy film co-written and directed by Vince Di Meglio and starring Diane Keaton as a mother who is over-attached to her adult son, played by Dax Shepard. The film aired on Lifetime in 2009.

Plot 
Noah Cooper, (Dax Shepard) a therapist, gets fired from the office where he has worked for many years. When he arrives home he finds his wife's cousin, Myron Stubbs, (Mike White) has moved in. Later that evening his mother, Marilyn (Diane Keaton) also arrives with her dogs and asks whether she can stay. Even though Noah is displeased, he allows Marilyn to stay. He discovers his mother has left his father, suspecting that he had an affair. He and Marilyn get hired at a carpet store, but because of Marilyn's stupid tasks both of them get fired. Meanwhile, his relationship with his wife, Clare, (Liv Tyler) deteriorates and she subsequently leaves. Marilyn spies her husband and they have an encounter. Her husband, Gene (Ken Howard) confesses that he cheated on her twice. Noah's grandmother, Helen Cooper (Selma Stern) dies, and at the funeral Noah and Maryiln debate. Noah gets moved by his mother's words and realises that his decision not to have a baby was wrong and rushes to Clare to apologize. The film ends with Marylin and Myron moving in together elsewhere.

Cast 
 Diane Keaton as Marilyn Cooper
 Dax Shepard as Noah Cooper
 Liv Tyler as Clare Cooper
 Mike White as Myron Stubbs
 Ken Howard as Gene Cooper
 Selma Stern as Helen Cooper
 Jerry Lambert as Donnie Booker
 Don Lake as Minister
 Sarah Lancaster as Holly

References

External links 
 
 

2008 films
2008 comedy films
American comedy films
Variance Films films
2000s English-language films
2000s American films